Stillwater Township is a township in Bowman County in the U.S. state of North Dakota. Its population during the 2010 Census was 28.

References

Townships in Bowman County, North Dakota
Townships in North Dakota